Kurt Børset (born 21 May 1973) is a Norwegian former ski jumper.

In the World Cup he finished once among the top 10, with an eighth place from Planica in March 1994, which doubled as the FIS Ski-Flying World Championships 1994.

He lives in Løkken Verk.

References

1973 births
Living people
Norwegian male ski jumpers
People from Sør-Trøndelag
Sportspeople from Trøndelag